The 1949–50 AHL season was the 14th season of the American Hockey League. Ten teams played 70 games each in the schedule. The Cleveland Barons won their seventh F. G. "Teddy" Oke Trophy as West Division champions. The Indianapolis Capitals and won their second Calder Cup as league champions.

Team changes
 The Philadelphia Rockets cease operations.
 The Washington Lions move to Cincinnati, Ohio becoming the Cincinnati Mohawks.
 The Cincinnati Mohawks then switch divisions with the Buffalo Bisons.

Final standings
Note: GP = Games played; W = Wins; L = Losses; T = Ties; GF = Goals for; GA = Goals against; Pts = Points;

Scoring leaders

Note: GP = Games played; G = Goals; A = Assists; Pts = Points; PIM = Penalty minutes

 complete list

Calder Cup playoffs
First round
Cleveland Barons defeated Buffalo Bisons 4 games to 1.
Providence Reds defeated Springfield Indians 2 games to 0.
Indianapolis Capitals defeated St. Louis Flyers 2 games to 0.
Second round
Cleveland Barons earned second round bye.
Indianapolis Capitals defeated Providence Reds 2 games to 0.
Finals
Indianapolis Capitals defeated Cleveland Barons 4 games to 0, to win the Calder Cup. 
 list of scores

Trophy and Award winners
Team Awards

Individual Awards

See also
List of AHL seasons

External links 
AHL official site
AHL Hall of Fame
HockeyDB

American Hockey League seasons
AHL